Affonso Henrique Beato (born July 13, 1941) is a Brazilian cinematographer. He has served as the President of the Brazilian Society of Cinematographers, receiving a Lifetime Achievement Award in 2013. He is also a member of the American Society of Cinematographers. In 2017, he became a member of The Academy of Motion Picture Arts and Sciences.

Beato was born in Rio de Janeiro. He started his cinematic career during the 1960s, gaining international recognition with his work on Glauber Rocha's Antonio das Mortes (1969).

From the 1970s, he started an international career, notably collaborating with directors Jim McBride (The Big Easy, Great Balls of Fire! ) and Pedro Almodóvar (The Flower of My Secret, Live Flesh and All About My Mother). In 2004, he was the Director of Photography on fellow Brazilian Walter Salles's first Hollywood effort Dark Water. Other notable credits include Ghost World, The Queen, Love In The Time Of Cholera, and Nights in Rodanthe.

Filmography

Film

Documentary films

Television films

Actor

References

External links
Official page

1941 births
Brazilian cinematographers
Living people
Art Center College of Design faculty